The Patmore Estate is a housing estate in Battersea within the London Borough of Wandsworth in London, England. The 28 red-brick apartment buildings were erected in the 1950s.

Notable residents
 Malachi Kirby, actor

References

Housing estates in the London Borough of Wandsworth
1950s establishments in England